Persewangi stands for Persatuan Sepakbola Banyuwangi (English: Football Association of Banyuwangi) is an  Indonesian football club based in Diponegoro Stadium, Banyuwangi Regency, East Java. They currently compete in the Liga 3.

Players

Current squad

References

External links
Persewangi Banyuwangi at persewangi.or.id
Official Fans Blog
 

 
Football clubs in Indonesia
Football clubs in East Java
Association football clubs established in 1970
1970 establishments in Indonesia